Blaska is a surname. Notable people with the surname include:

Jerome L. Blaska (1919–2000), American politician, son of John
John M. Blaska (1885–1957), American politician